Felix Ahmed Aboagye (born 5 December 1975) is a retired Ghanaian professional footballer who played primarily as a striker. He last professional club football for Mumbai FC in the I-League.

International career 
He represented his homeland by the 1998 African Cup of Nations in Burkina Faso and 1996 African Cup of Nations in South Africa. He was a member of the Ghana national football team at the 1996 Summer Olympics in Atlanta.

Honours 
Mahindra United
POMIS Cup: 2003

References

External links
 

Ghanaian footballers
Association football forwards
Liberty Professionals F.C. players
Ghanaian expatriate footballers
Expatriate footballers in Kuwait
Olympiacos F.C. players
Expatriate footballers in Greece
Al Ahly SC players
Expatriate footballers in India
Ghana international footballers
Expatriate footballers in Vietnam
Olympic footballers of Ghana
Ghanaian expatriate sportspeople in India
Ghanaian expatriate sportspeople in Vietnam
Footballers at the 1996 Summer Olympics
1975 births
Living people
Ghanaian expatriate sportspeople in Egypt
1996 African Cup of Nations players
Mumbai FC players
1998 African Cup of Nations players
Expatriate footballers in the Maldives
Club Valencia players
Qatar SC players
Dawu Youngstars players
Footballers from Kumasi
Egyptian Premier League players
Al-Nasr SC (Dubai) players
Ghanaian expatriate sportspeople in Kuwait
Ghanaian expatriate sportspeople in Greece
Ghanaian expatriate sportspeople in the United Arab Emirates
Ghanaian expatriate sportspeople in Qatar
Ghanaian expatriate sportspeople in the Maldives
Mahindra United FC players
Khatoco Khánh Hòa FC players
East Bengal Club players
Kuwait Premier League players
Zamalek SC players
Al-Arabi SC (Kuwait) players